Winters Brothers is an American company.

Winters Brothers may also refer to:

Mike and Bernie Winters, British comedians
Robert and Thomas Wintour, Gunpowder plotters
Johnny Winter and Edgar Winter, American musicians and brothers